The Origins of Totalitarianism, published in 1951, was Hannah Arendt's first major work, wherein she describes and analyzes Nazism and Stalinism as the major totalitarian political movements of the first half of the 20th century.

History 

The Origins of Totalitarianism was first published in English in 1951. A second, enlarged edition was published in 1958, and contained two additional chapters, replacing her original "Concluding Remarks". Chapter Thirteen was titled "Ideology and Terror: A novel form of government", which she had published separately in 1953. Chapter Fourteen dealt with the Hungarian Revolution of 1956, entitled "Epilogue: Reflections on the Hungarian Revolution". Subsequent editions omitted this chapter, which was published separately in English ("Totalitarian Imperialism: Reflections on the Hungarian Revolution") and German (Die ungarische Revolution und der totalitäre Imperialismus) in 1958.

Structure and content 

Like many of Arendt's books, The Origins of Totalitarianism is structured as three essays: "Antisemitism", "Imperialism" and "Totalitarianism". The book describes the various preconditions and subsequent rise of anti-Semitism in central, eastern, and western Europe in the early-to-mid 19th century; then examines the New Imperialism, from 1884 to the start of the First World War (1914–18); then traces the emergence of racism as an ideology, and its modern application as an “ideological weapon for imperialism”, by the Boers during the Great Trek in the early 19th century  (1830s–40s). In this book, Arendt argues that totalitarianism was a "novel form of government," that "differs essentially from other forms of political oppression known to us such as despotism, tyranny and dictatorship" in that it applied terror to subjugate mass populations rather than just political adversaries. Further, Arendt states that, owing to its peculiar ideology and the role assigned to it in its apparatus of coercion, "totalitarianism has discovered a means of dominating and terrorizing human beings from within"  She further contends that Jewry was not the operative factor in the Holocaust, but merely a convenient proxy. That totalitarianism in Germany was, in the end, about terror and consistency, not eradicating Jews only. A key concept arising from this book was the application of Kant's phrase "Radical Evil", which she applied to the men who created and carried out such tyranny and their depiction of their victims as "Superfluous People".

Analysis of antisemitism and imperialism

Arendt begins the book with an analysis of the rise of antisemitism in Europe, particularly focusing on the Dreyfus affair. In particular, Arendt traces the social movement of the Jewry in Europe since their emancipation by the French edict of 1792, and their special role in supporting and maintaining the nation-state, while failing to assimilate into the European class society. The European Jewry's association with the nation-state meant that their destinies were to an extent tied. As Arendt observed, "modern anti semitism grew in proportion as traditional nationalism declined, and reached its climax at the exact moment when the European system of nation-states and its precarious balance of power crashed." Nazi Germany would later exploit this antisemitism, and targeted the Jewry which was construed, among other things, as a proxy for the nation-state. In so doing, Nazism sought, among other reasons, to organize the masses to bring about the disintegration of the nation-state system, and to advance the totalitarian project which was global in its orientation.

She then discusses scientific racism, and its role in colonialist imperialism, itself characterized by unlimited territorial and economic expansion. That unlimited expansion necessarily opposed itself and was hostile to the territorially delimited nation-state. Arendt traces the roots of modern imperialism to the accumulation of excess capital in European nation-states during the 19th century.  This capital required overseas investments outside of Europe to be productive and political control had to be expanded overseas to protect the investments.  She then examines "continental imperialism" (pan-Germanism and pan-Slavism) and the emergence of "movements" substituting themselves to the political parties. These movements are hostile to the state and antiparliamentarist and gradually institutionalize anti-Semitism and other kinds of racism.

Arendt concludes that while Italian Fascism was a nationalist authoritarian movement, Nazism and Stalinism were totalitarian movements that sought to eliminate all restraints upon the power of the movement. She attributes the difference, in part, to a minimum necessary population: [T]otalitarian movements depend on the sheer force of numbers to such an extent that totalitarian regimes seem impossible, even under otherwise favorable circumstances, in countries with relatively small populations.... [E]ven Mussolini, who was so fond of the term "totalitarian state," did not attempt to establish a full-fledged totalitarian regime and contented himself with dictatorship and one-party rule.

Mechanics of totalitarian movements 

The book's final section is devoted to describing the mechanics of totalitarian movements, focusing on Nazi Germany and the Soviet Union. Here, Arendt discusses the transformation of classes into masses, the role of propaganda in dealing with the non-totalitarian world, and the use of terror, essential to this form of government. Totalitarian movements are fundamentally different from autocratic regimes, says Arendt, insofar as autocratic regimes seek only to gain absolute political power and to outlaw opposition, while totalitarian regimes seek to dominate every aspect of everyone's life as a prelude to world domination. She states: ... Intellectual, spiritual, and artistic initiative is as dangerous to totalitarianism as the gangster initiative of the mob, and both are more dangerous than mere political opposition. The consistent persecution of every higher form of intellectual activity by the new mass leaders springs from more than their natural resentment against everything they cannot understand. Total domination does not allow for free initiative in any field of life, for any activity that is not entirely predictable. Totalitarianism in power invariably replaces all first-rate talents, regardless of their sympathies, with those crackpots and fools whose lack of intelligence and creativity is still the best guarantee of their loyalty. 

Hannah Arendt considers the Soviet and Nazi regimes alongside European colonies in Africa and Asia, as their later and gruesome transformation due to the effect of imperial boomerang. She analyzes Russian pan-Slavism as a stage in the development of racism and totalitarianism. Her analysis was continued by Alexander Etkind in the book "Internal colonization: Russia's imperial experience".

Arendt discusses the use of front organizations, fake governmental agencies, and esoteric doctrines as a means of concealing the radical nature of totalitarian aims from the non-totalitarian world. Near the end of the book, Arendt writes that loneliness is a precondition for totalitarian domination, with people who are socially isolated more likely to be attracted to totalitarian ideology and movements.

Reception

Le Monde placed the book among the 100 best books of any kind of the 20th century, while the National Review ranked it #15 on its list of the 100 best non-fiction books of the century. The Intercollegiate Studies Institute listed it among the 50 best non-fiction books of the century. The book made a major impact on Norman Podhoretz, who compared the pleasure of reading it to that of reading a great poem or novel.

The book has also attracted criticism, among them a piece in the Times Literary Supplement in 2009 by University of Chicago professor Bernard Wasserstein. Wasserstein cited Arendt's systematic internalization of the various anti-Semitic and Nazi sources and books she was familiar with, which led to the use of many of these sources as authorities in the book. As a counterpoint to Wasserstein's argument here, we might look Gershom Scholem's most trenchant criticism of Arendt in context: Scholem, when criticizing Eichmann in Jerusalem still praises the Origins of Totalitarianism. In several other places, Scholem mentions that he learned from Ernst Bloch that in historical periods where much of Jewish literature and testimony that would have been available or might have existed during periods of pogroms, antisemitic sources must be consulted since they contain the only surviving references in certain areas. 

Historian Emmanuelle Saada disputes Arendt's work and in general scholarly consensus, that the rise of scientific racism directly correlates with the rise of colonialist imperialism. Saada contests that there is little evidence to support that ideas like those of Arthur de Gobineau, whom Arendt explicitly mentions, hold an important place in the scientific justification of European colonialism. Saada asserts that Arendt overemphasizes the role of scientific racism in forming modern totalitarianism, when in reality, Arendt should attribute blame to the "bureaucratic racism" she discusses elsewhere in the text.

Such scholars as Jürgen Habermas supported Arendt in her 20th century criticism of totalitarian readings of Marxism. This commentary on Marxism has indicated concerns with the limits of totalitarian perspectives often associated with Marx's apparent over-estimation of the emancipatory potential of the forces of production. Habermas extends this critique in his writings on functional reductionism in the life-world in his Lifeworld and System: A Critique of Functionalist Reason.

See also

John A. Hobson's Imperialism (1902)
[[Le Monde's 100 Books of the Century|Le Monde'''s 100 Books of the Century]]
Theodor Adorno's The Authoritarian Personality (1950)

Note

References

 Bibliography 

 
 
  excerpt''
 
 *

Works by Arendt 
 , (see also The Origins of Totalitarianism and Comparison of Nazism and Stalinism) Full text (1979 edition) on Internet Archive
  (reprinted in ) here

External links 

 Early typescript of book

1951 non-fiction books
Books by Hannah Arendt
Books about antisemitism
Books about fascism
Books about Nazism
Works about New Imperialism
Works about Stalinism
Books about totalitarianism
Schocken Books books